The 1978–79 Los Angeles Kings season was the Kings' 12th season in the National Hockey League.

Offseason

Regular season

Final standings

Schedule and results

Playoffs

Player statistics

Awards and records

Transactions
The Kings were involved in the following transactions during the 1978–79 season.

Trades

Free agent signings

Free agents lost

Free agent compensation 
Dale McCourt refused to report to Los Angeles and sued the NHL. He played the 1978-79 season with the Red Wings.

Waivers

Draft picks
Los Angeles's draft picks at the 1978 NHL Amateur Draft held at the Queen Elizabeth Hotel in Montreal, Quebec.

Farm teams

See also
1978–79 NHL season

References

External links

Los Angeles Kings seasons
Los Angeles Kings
Los Angeles Kings
Los Angeles Kings season
Los Angeles Kings season